Oryad Rural District is in the Central District of Mahneshan County, Zanjan province, Iran. At the National Census of 2006, its population was 6,413 in 1,299 households. There were 5,537 inhabitants in 1,308 households at the following census of 2011. At the most recent census of 2016, the population of the rural district was 5,196 in 1,586 households. The largest of its 29 villages was Pari, with 855 people.

References 

Mahneshan County

Rural Districts of Zanjan Province

Populated places in Zanjan Province

Populated places in Mahneshan County